The Academy is the eponymous debut EP of The Academy Is..., released on March 23, 2004 by LLR Recordings. The CD was originally released before the band appended the "Is..." to their name. It features drummer Mike DelPrincipe and guitarist AJ LaTrace, who left the band after the recording of their full-length debut, Almost Here (2005).

Track listing

Personnel
William Beckett – vocals
Mike Carden – rhythm guitar
Michael DelPrincipe – drums
AJ LaTrace – lead guitar
Adam T. Siska – bass

References

The Academy Is... albums
2004 debut EPs